William Lee (12 August 1878 – 5 November 1934), better known as Billy Lee, was an English footballer who played as a centre forward. He played in the Football League for West Bromwich Albion and Chesterfield Town.

Biography 
Lee was born in West Bromwich. He turned professional with West Bromwich Albion in September 1901. In 1903 he joined Bournemouth Wanderers on loan. He signed for Portsmouth in September 1904 for a £100 fee. In August 1906 he moved to New Brompton for £50, and a year later joined Chesterfield Town for the same fee. He joined Darlaston on a free transfer in October 1908 and retired due to injury in May 1911. He died in Walsall in 1934.

References 
General
 
Specific

1878 births
1934 deaths
Sportspeople from West Bromwich
English footballers
Association football forwards
Bournville Athletic F.C. players
West Bromwich Albion F.C. players
Portsmouth F.C. players
Gillingham F.C. players
Chesterfield F.C. players
Darlaston Town F.C. players
English Football League players